EXM may refer to:
 Entesa per Mallorca, a defunct Spanish political party
 Excel Maritime, an American shipping company
 Exmouth railway station, in England
 Expansion microscopy